F'Real is the first album by hip hop artist Murs. It was released by the Independent record label, Veritech Records, in 1997, and is very rare.

Track listing
2 Reasons Feat. Asop
8th Samurai
4 The Record
BasikMurs
Interview With The Dominant Feat. Kirby Dominant
Dominant Freestyle
M-3 (Anger)
Say Anything Feat. Arata, Bizarro, The Grouch & P$C
The Saint
Morocco Mike
Nine-Five
The Maguire Song
Live My Life
Nites Like This
The Extras Feat. Big Texas & Evanessence
Ease Back
The Sermon

References

Murs (rapper) albums
1997 debut albums